Gridcoin (Abbreviation: GRC) is an open source cryptocurrency which securely rewards volunteer computing performed on the BOINC network. Originally developed to support SETI@home, it became the platform for many other applications in areas as diverse as medicine, molecular biology, mathematics, linguistics, climatology, environmental science, and astrophysics.

Gridcoin requires a significant level of skill in order to begin "crunching". Despite this Gridcoin's ability to monetise idle computing time, "crunching" can modestly help with reducing digital divide. But its main benefit is the CPU time being used for research and helping to solve scientific problems.

It was created on October 16, 2013, by Rob Halförd. Gridcoin, initially using the energy intensive proof of work - as used by Bitcoin, before migrating to a proof of stake protocol in 2014, similar to Peercoin, in an attempt to address the environmental impact of cryptocurrency mining.

An exploit was demonstrated in August 2017 that revealed the emails of Gridcoin users and allowed the theft of other users work. The research team disclosed the vulnerability to the developers in September 2016, and the patch for the vulnerability was released in March 2017 with version 3.5.8.7, however the implementation of the fix introduced other issues.

The implementation Gridcoin-Research was created as a fork of Bitcoin and Peercoin and is licensed under the MIT License. It uses Qt 5 for its user interface and prebuilt executables of the wallet are distributed for Windows, macOS, and Debian.

References

External links
 

Cryptocurrency projects
volunteer computing